Bruce Charles Heezen (April 11, 1924 – June 21, 1977) was an American geologist. He worked with oceanographic cartographer Marie Tharp at Columbia University to map the Mid-Atlantic Ridge in the 1950s.

Biography
Heezen was born in Vinton, Iowa. An only child, he moved at age six with his parents to Muscatine, Iowa, where he graduated from high school in 1942. He received his B.A. from the University of Iowa in 1947. He received his M.A. in 1952 and a Ph.D in 1957 from Columbia University.

Heezen collaborated extensively with cartographer Marie Tharp. He interpreted their joint work on the Mid-Atlantic ridge as supporting S. Warren Carey's Expanding Earth Theory, developed in the 1950s, but under Tharp's influence "eventually gave up the idea of an expanding earth for a form of continental drift in the mid-1960s." Tharp was Heezen's assistant while he was a graduate student and he gave her the task of drafting seafloor profiles. When she showed Heezen that her plotting of the North Atlantic revealed a rift valley, Heezen initially dismissed it.  Eventually they discovered that not only was there a North Atlantic rift valley, but a mountain range with a central valley that spanned the earth.  They also realized that the oceanic earthquakes they had been separately plotting fell within the rift, a revolutionary theory at the time. He presented this mid-ocean rift and earthquake theory at Princeton in 1957. At that lecture, preeminent geologist Harry Hess told Heezen, "Young man, you have shaken the foundations of geology!"

Heezen died of a heart attack in 1977 while on a research cruise to study the Mid-Atlantic Ridge near Iceland aboard the NR-1 submarine.

Honors and awards
1964: Henry Bryant Bigelow Medal in Oceanography awarded by the Woods Hole Oceanographic Institution
1973: Cullum Geographical Medal awarded by the American Geographical Society

The Oceanographic Survey Ship USNS Bruce C. Heezen was christened in honor of him in 1999.

Heezen Canyon is a large underwater canyon in the NW Atlantic, on the edge of the continental shelf.

Heezen Glacier in Antarctica was named after him in 1977.

References

External links

Manuscript painting of Heezen-Tharp "World ocean floor" map by Berann — Library of Congress Catalog

1924 births
1977 deaths
University of Iowa alumni
Columbia University alumni
Columbia University faculty
20th-century American geologists
American oceanographers
People from Vinton, Iowa
People from Muscatine, Iowa
Recipients of the Cullum Geographical Medal
Tectonicists